Guilfoile is a surname. Notable people with the surname include:

Bill Guilfoile (1931–2016), American public relations executive
Kevin Guilfoile (born 1968), American novelist, essayist, and humorist

See also
 Guilfoil
 Guilfoyle